This page lists the World Best Year Performance in the year 1994 in the men's decathlon. One of the main events during this season were the 1994 European Championships in Helsinki, Finland, where the competition started on August 12, 1994, and ended on August 13, 1994.

Records

1994 World Year Ranking

See also
1994 Hypo-Meeting
1994 Décastar

References
decathlon2000
apulanta
digilander

1994
Decathlon Year Ranking, 1994